Frederick Dickinson Williams (1829–1915) was an American landscape artist. He had studied at the Harvard University and started his career as a school arts teacher.

References

1829 births
1915 deaths
19th-century American painters
19th-century American male artists
American male painters
20th-century American painters
20th-century American male artists